William Davies (1884 – 1954) was an English footballer who played for Stoke.

Career
Davies was born in Longton and played amateur football with Newcastle Rangers before joining Stoke in 1907. He scored twice in ten appearances in 1907–08 and then he scored 14 goals in 21 matches in 1908–09.

Career statistics

References

English footballers
Stoke City F.C. players
English Football League players
1884 births
1954 deaths
Association football forwards